Newa is a Unicode block containing characters from the Newa alphabet, which is used to write Nepal Bhasa.

History 

A Unicode character set was initially proposed in May 2011. A previous tentative mapping of the first SMP also included the script and later versions include the proposal. A revised proposal using the name "Newar" is reflected in the roadmap from 6.0.12. This revised proposal was "to enable the broadest representation of the Newar script, from the historical forms of Old Newar manuscripts to the present style of 'Prachalit' known as 'Nepal Lipi'". An alternative proposal was produced by a group of Newars in Kathmandu led by Devdass Manandhar supported by the linguist Tej Ratna Kansakar, which differed in a number of ways from the Pandey proposals, the most significant being the inclusion of a number of breathy (nasalised) consonants which had historically been written with a grapheme that could be mistaken for a conjunct but written the wrong way round.

The following Unicode-related documents record the purpose and process of defining specific characters in the Newa block:

References 

Unicode blocks